Villaluenga del Rosario is a village located in the province of Cádiz, Spain. According to the 2005 census, the city has a population of 481 inhabitants. It is located down Navazo Alto mountain, within the Sierra de Grazalema Natural Park. The village is famous for its payoyo cheese, first produced in 1996 from the milk of the local, endangered Payoya goat.

Demographics

Gallery

References

External links 

Villaluenga del Rosario - Sistema de Información Multiterritorial de Andalucía

Municipalities of the Province of Cádiz